The 2019 Lale Cup was a professional tennis tournament played on outdoor hard courts. It was the seventh edition of the tournament which was part of the 2019 ITF Women's World Tennis Tour. It took place in Istanbul, Turkey between 8 and 14 April 2019.

Singles main-draw entrants

Seeds

 1 Rankings are as of 1 April 2019.

Other entrants
The following players received wildcards into the singles main draw:
  İpek Öz
  Zeynep Sönmez
  İpek Soylu
  Betina Tokaç

The following players received entry from the qualifying draw:
  Ilona Kremen
  Sofya Lansere
  Ivana Popovic
  Iryna Shymanovich
  Ana Vrljić
  Stephanie Wagner

Champions

Singles

 Vitalia Diatchenko def.  Ankita Raina, 6–4, 6–0

Doubles

 Marie Bouzková /  Rosalie van der Hoek def.  Ilona Kremen /  Iryna Shymanovich, 7–5, 6–7(2–7), [10–5]

References

External links
 2019 Lale Cup at ITFtennis.com

2019 ITF Women's World Tennis Tour
2019 in Turkish tennis
April 2019 sports events in Turkey
Lale Cup
2019 in Turkish women's sport